Euceratobunus pulcher is a species of harvestmen in a monotypic genus in the family Sclerosomatidae from India.

References

Harvestmen
Monotypic arachnid genera